The 20th Legislative Assembly of Ontario was in session from October 6, 1937, until June 30, 1943, just prior to the 1943 general election. The majority party was the Ontario Liberal Party led by Mitchell Hepburn.

In 1938, the title "Member of Provincial Parliament", abbreviated as "MPP", was officially adopted by the members of the legislative assembly.

Hepburn resigned as Premier in October 1942, remaining party leader, and Gordon Daniel Conant became Premier. In 1943, Harry Nixon became both party leader and Premier after a leadership convention was held for the provincial Liberal party.

Norman Otto Hipel served as speaker for the assembly until September 2, 1938. James Howard Clark replaced Hipel as speaker.

Members elected to the Assembly
Italicized names indicate members returned by acclamation.

Timeline

External links 
Members in Parliament 20

References 

Terms of the Legislative Assembly of Ontario
1937 establishments in Ontario
1943 disestablishments in Ontario